William Anne Holles Capell, 4th Earl of Essex (7 October 1732 – 4 March 1799), was a British landowner and peer, a member of the House of Lords.

Early life
Capell was born on 7 October 1732 in Turin. He was the son of William Capell, 3rd Earl of Essex (1696–1743), by his second marriage, to Lady Elizabeth Russell. From his father's first marriage to Lady Jane Hyde (a Lady of the Bedchamber to the Princess of Wales and the third daughter of Henry Hyde, 4th Earl of Clarendon), he had several older half-sisters, including Lady Charlotte Capell (wife of Thomas Villiers, 1st Earl of Clarendon), and Lady Mary Capell (wife of Admiral of the Fleet John Forbes, second son of George Forbes, 3rd Earl of Granard).

His paternal grandparents were Algernon Capell, 2nd Earl of Essex and Lady Mary Bentinck (eldest daughter of William Bentinck, 1st Earl of Portland and Anne Villiers). His mother was a daughter of Wriothesley Russell, 2nd Duke of Bedford and the former Elizabeth Howland (daughter and heiress of John Howland of Streatham).

Career
In January 1743, at the age of ten, he inherited his father's titles and estates. In 1753, at the age of twenty-one, he took his seat in the House of Lords. From 1755 to 1769, he was a Lord of the Bedchamber to King George II. He again served in this role for King George III from 1782 to 1799.

Lord Essex served as Lord Lieutenant of Hertfordshire from 1764 to 1771. In 1770, he was made the last Master of the Staghounds.

Personal life
On 1 August 1754, the Earl of Essex married, firstly, Frances Hanbury Williams, the daughter of Charles Hanbury Williams of Coldbroke and of Lady Francis Coningsby of Hampton Court Castle (a daughter and co-heiress of Thomas Coningsby, 1st Earl Coningsby). 

By his first wife, he had three children (George and his sister Elizabeth were painted in a double-portrait by Sir Joshua Reynolds in 1768, now in the Metropolitan Museum of Art, New York):

 Lady Elizabeth Capell (1755–1834), who married John Monson, 3rd Baron Monson.
 George Capell-Coningsby, 5th Earl of Essex (1757–1839), who married two times.
 Lady Frances Capell (1759–1759), who died shortly after her mother gave birth to her in 1759. 

Several years after her death in childbirth in 1759, he married, secondly, Harriet Bladen (1735–1821), on 2 March 1767. Harriet was the daughter of Colonel Thomas Bladen of Glastonbury Abbey, Somerset. By his second wife, he had four children:

 John Thomas Capell (1769–1819), who married Lady Caroline Paget, a daughter of Henry Paget, 1st Earl of Uxbridge and sister of Henry Paget, 1st Marquess of Anglesey.
 Thomas Edward Capell (1770–1855), a general who died unmarried.
 William Robert Capell (1775–1854), who married Sarah Salter, only daughter of Samuel Salter of Rickmansworth, in 1802.
 Bladen Thomas Capell (1776–1853), the Vice-Admiral of the Blue who married Harriet Catherine Smyth, daughter of Francis George Smyth, in 1816.

Essex died on 4 March 1799 at St James's Palace, Westminster.

References

Further reading
 The Earls of Essex, their wives and children at Cassiobury House, Cassiobury Collection, Watford Museum

|-

1732 births
1799 deaths
18th-century British people
William
William
Lord-Lieutenants of Hertfordshire
British slave owners